Cheng Cheng-chung (born 9 July 1936) is a Taiwanese weightlifter. He competed in the men's light heavyweight event at the 1964 Summer Olympics.

References

1936 births
Living people
Taiwanese male weightlifters
Olympic weightlifters of Taiwan
Weightlifters at the 1964 Summer Olympics
Place of birth missing (living people)